Viktor Fyodorovich Bokov (6 (19) September 1914 — 15 October 2009) was a Russian and Soviet poet, writer, and collector of folklore.

His son is the artist Konstantin Bokov who immigrated to the United States in 1975.

See also 
 List of Russian-language poets

References

External links
 Стихи Виктора Бокова
 Видеозаписи песен на стихи Виктора Бокова
 Виктор Боков. «Моя Россия»
 Виктор Боков. «Поэтика моя проста»
 Виктор Боков. Сибирское сидение

1914 births
2009 deaths
20th-century Russian male writers
20th-century Russian poets
Recipients of the Order "For Merit to the Fatherland", 3rd class
Recipients of the Order "For Merit to the Fatherland", 4th class
Recipients of the Order of Friendship of Peoples
Recipients of the Order of the Red Banner of Labour
Russian male poets
Russian male writers
Soviet male poets
Gulag detainees
Maxim Gorky Literature Institute alumni